Delusional misidentification syndrome is an umbrella term, introduced by Christodoulou (in his book The Delusional Misidentification Syndromes, Karger, Basel, 1986) for a group of delusional disorders that occur in the context of mental and neurological illness. They all involve a belief that the identity of a person, object, or place has somehow changed or has been altered. As these delusions typically only concern one particular topic, they also fall under the category called monothematic delusions.

This psychopathological syndrome is usually considered to include four main variants:
 The Capgras delusion is the belief that (usually) a close relative or spouse has been replaced by an identical-looking impostor.
 The Fregoli delusion is the belief that various people the believer meets are actually the same person in disguise.
 Intermetamorphosis is the belief that an individual has the ability to take the form of another person in both external appearance and internal personality.
 Subjective doubles, described by Christodoulou in 1978 (American Journal of Psychiatry 135, 249, 1978), is the belief that there is a doppelgänger or double of themselves carrying out independent actions.

However, similar delusional beliefs, often singularly or more rarely reported, are sometimes also considered to be part of the delusional misidentification syndrome. For example:
 Mirrored-self misidentification is the belief that one's reflection in a mirror is some other person.
 Reduplicative paramnesia is the belief that a familiar person, place, object, or body part has been duplicated. For example, a person may believe that they are in fact not in the hospital to which they were admitted, but an identical-looking hospital in a different part of the country, despite this being obviously false.
Cotard's syndrome  is a rare disorder in which people hold a delusional belief that they are dead (either figuratively or literally), do not exist, are putrefying, or have lost their blood or internal organs.  In rare instances, it can include delusions of immortality.
 Syndrome of delusional companions is the belief that objects (such as soft toys) are sentient beings.
 Clonal pluralization of the self, where a person believes there are multiple copies of themselves, identical both physically and psychologically, but physically separate and distinct.
 Clinical lycanthropy is the belief that one is turning or has turned into an animal. It is considered a delusional misidentification of the self.

There is considerable evidence that disorders such as the Capgras or Fregoli syndromes are associated with disorders of face perception and recognition. However, it has been suggested that all misidentification problems exist on a continuum of anomalies of familiarity, from déjà vu at one end to the formation of delusional beliefs at the other.

See also
 Prosopagnosia
 Cognitive neuropsychiatry
 Crisis actor conspiracy theory
 Implicit memory
 The Truman Show delusion

References

Psychosis
Delusional disorders
Psychopathological syndromes
Delusions